Al Hawkins is a Canadian politician, who was elected to the Newfoundland and Labrador House of Assembly in the 2015 provincial election. He represented the electoral district of Grand Falls-Windsor-Buchans as a member of the Liberal Party until 2019.

Following the Liberals forming government in the 2015 election, Hawkins served as Minister of Transportation and Works. In September 2017, he was shuffled to Minister of Advanced Education, Skills and Labour, and in November 2018, was moved to Minister of Education and Early Childhood Development.

Prior to his election to the legislature, Hawkins served as mayor of Grand Falls-Windsor. He also served on the board of directors of Newfoundland and Labrador Hydro, Bull Arm Fabrication and Nalcor.

He was defeated in the 2019 provincial election.

References

Living people
Liberal Party of Newfoundland and Labrador MHAs
Mayors of places in Newfoundland and Labrador
Members of the Executive Council of Newfoundland and Labrador
People from Grand Falls-Windsor
21st-century Canadian politicians
Year of birth missing (living people)